
Gmina Obryte is a rural gmina (administrative district) in Pułtusk County, Masovian Voivodeship, in east-central Poland.

Villages
Gmina Obryte contains the villages and settlements of Bartodzieje, Ciółkowo Małe, Ciółkowo Nowe, Ciółkowo Rządowe, Cygany, Gostkowo, Gródek Rządowy, Kalinowo, Mokrus, Nowy Gródek, Obryte, Płusy, Psary, Rowy, Rozdziały, Sadykierz, Skłudy, Sokołowo Włościańskie, Sokołowo-Parcele, Stare Zambski, Tocznabiel, Ulaski, Wielgolas and Zambski Kościelne.

Neighbouring gminas
Gmina Obryte is bordered by the gminas of Pułtusk, Rząśnik, Rzewnie, Szelków and Zatory.

References

External links
Polish official population figures 2006

Obryte
Pułtusk County